The Synthetonychiidae are a small family of harvestman with a handful of species in a single genus. They are endemic to New Zealand.

Description
Species in this family are between one and two millimeters long, with legs up to almost six mm.

Distribution
All described species occur only on New Zealand.

Relationships
Synthetonychiidae seem to be closely related to the Triaenonychidae from the Australian region.

Name
The name of the type genus is combined from Ancient Greek synthetos "compounded" and onychion, the diminutive of onyx "claw".

Species

 Synthetonychia oliveae Forster, 1954
 Synthetonychia acuta Forster, 1954
 Synthetonychia cornua Forster, 1954
 Synthetonychia fiordensis Forster, 1954
 Synthetonychia glacialis Forster, 1954
 Synthetonychia florae Forster, 1954
 Synthetonychia hughsoni Forster, 1954
 Synthetonychia minuta Forster, 1954
 Synthetonychia obtusa Forster, 1954
 Synthetonychia oparara Forster, 1954
 Synthetonychia proxima Forster, 1954
 Synthetonychia ramosa Forster, 1954
 Synthetonychia sinuosa Forster, 1954
 Synthetonychia wairarapae Forster, 1954

Footnotes

References
 's Biology Catalog: Synthetonychidae [sic]
  (eds.) (2007): Harvestmen - The Biology of Opiliones. Harvard University Press 

Harvestmen
Harvestman families
Monogeneric arthropod families